David Marrero was the defender of championship title, but lost to Christophe Rochus in the second round.
Daniel Brands won in the final 6–7(4), 6–3, 6–4, against Pablo Andújar.

Seeds

Draw

Finals

Top half

Bottom half

References
 Main Draw
 Qualifying Draw

Mitsubishi Electric Europe Cup - Singles
Internazionali di Monza E Brianza